Hellzapoppin' can refer to:

 Hellzapoppin (musical), a 1938 musical
 Hellzapoppin (film), a 1941 film
 Hellzapoppin, a one-shot 1972 television variety show
Hellzapoppin (album), a 1992 album by New Zealand band The 3Ds